Mesosciera is a genus of moths of the family Erebidae. The genus was erected by George Hampson in 1926.

Species
Mesosciera orientalis Hampson, 1926 Singapore
Mesosciera picta Hampson, 1926 southern Nigeria
Mesosciera rubrinotata Hampson, 1926 southern Nigeria
Mesosciera typica (Hampson, 1926) Ghana

References

Calpinae
Moth genera